The Lost World of Mr. Hardy is a feature-length documentary film about a much loved family fishing tackle business. It was directed by Andy Heathcote and Heike Bachelier. The film tells the story of the disappearing art of the craftsman through the history of the Hardy Brothers, the Rolls-Royce of fishing tackle makers. The film includes rediscovered footage of salmon fishing 80 years ago shown with old film reels, filmed by L.R. Hardy and his chauffeur 'Appleby' in the 1920s.

The film was produced by Trufflepig Films who successfully self-distributed the project giving the film a UK cinema release in 2009/10. The film played well in rural cinemas across England.

References

External links

UK magazine reviews

2008 films
2008 documentary films
British documentary films
Fly fishing
British independent films
Films about fishing
2000s English-language films
2000s British films